Johnny Cash Sings Precious Memories is the fifth gospel and 50th overall album by country singer Johnny Cash, released in 1975 on Columbia Records. It is one of several spiritual albums that he recorded. Other examples include Hymns by Johnny Cash, Hymns from the Heart, The Holy Land and Believe in Him. The song selection includes several of Cash's personal favorites, as some would later be recorded again for My Mother's Hymn Book. Precious Memories may have been a replacement for an untitled Gospel album that Cash recorded during 1975 but never released; those recordings would be released in 2012 on the album Bootleg Vol. IV: The Soul of Truth. The albums was dedicated to Cash's late brother, Jack D. Cash, who died in May 1944.

Track listing

Personnel
Johnny Cash - vocals, guitar
 Bob Wootton, Carl Perkins, Johnny Christopher, Jerry Shook, Pete Wade - guitar
 Marshall Grant, John C. Williams - bass
 WS Holland - drums
 Beegie Crusser - piano
 Bill Walker - piano, arrangements, conductor 
 Bill Harris, Farrell Morris - percussion
 The Carter Family - vocals
Technical
Charlie Bragg, Ed Hudson, Freeman Ramsey, Roger Tucker - engineer
Bill Barnes, Julie Holiner - album design
Jim Abeita - front cover painting

References

External links
Luma Electronic entry on Sings Precious Memories

Johnny Cash albums
1975 albums
Columbia Records albums
Gospel albums by American artists